John Penn (January 28, 1700 – October 25, 1746) was an American-born merchant who was proprietor of the colonial Province of Pennsylvania (later the American state – the Commonwealth of Pennsylvania after 1776). He was the eldest son of the colony's founder, William Penn (1644–1718), by his second wife, Hannah Callowhill Penn (1671–1726). Since he was the only one of Penn's children to be born in the New World, the Americas (in the Slate Roof House in Philadelphia), he was called "the American" by his family.

Life 
Penn was raised by a cousin in Bristol, England, where he learned the trade of merchant, specializing in linen. As a result of his father's will and by his mother's appointment, he received half of the proprietorship of Pennsylvania.

On May 12, 1732, John—with his brothers Thomas Penn and Richard Penn, as the proprietors of Pennsylvania—signed an order to create a commission. This order was directed to Governor Gordon, Isaac Norris, Samuel Preston, James Logan, and Andrew Hamilton, Esquires, and to the gentlemen James Steel and Robert Charles. The commission, which was to be made up of at least three or more of these individuals, was given full power on behalf of the proprietors for the "running, marking, and laying out" of any boundary between Pennsylvania and Maryland. This was in accordance with the signed agreement between the Penn brothers and Charles Calvert, 5th Baron Baltimore on May 10, 1732.

He returned to Pennsylvania in September 1734 and attended the meetings of the Pennsylvania Provincial Council, but went back to England in 1735, to support the colony's rights in the boundary dispute with Maryland. The ultimate resolution of this dispute was the surveying of the Mason–Dixon line. Penn, his brother Thomas, and their agents were responsible for the infamous "Walking Purchase", under which the Penn family acquired more than one million acres (400,000 ha) of Pennsylvania land from the Lenape Indians.

He never married and died in Hitcham, Buckinghamshire, England, without issue, and was buried at Jordans. His will left his rights in the province and lower counties to his brother Thomas Penn.

Notes

Citations

Works cited

External links 

Penn family history

People of colonial Pennsylvania
American Quakers
1700 births
American people of Welsh descent
1746 deaths
Businesspeople from Bristol
John